Sampława  is a village in the administrative district of Gmina Lubawa, within Iława County, Warmian-Masurian Voivodeship, in northern Poland.

The village has a population of 440.

Notable residents
Karl-Friedrich von der Meden (1896–1961), Wehrmacht general

References

Villages in Iława County